Ancones may refer to:

Places
Ancones, Arroyo, Puerto Rico, a barrio
Ancones, San Germán, Puerto Rico, a barrio